The Hoyt Ruckus is Hoyt's performance driven youth compound bow. It measures 29.3/4 inches axel to axel. It has a huge range of adjustability with draw lengths going from 18-28 inches at 1 inch increments. This bow can be bought at 10-40 or 20-50 pounds draw weight. The bow itself weighs 2.8 pounds. This bow can be used for hunting or target archery.

The max draw weight for this bow increases as the draw length gets longer e.g.:
On the 20-50 pound model the maximum draw weight (50 pounds) can only be reached at the maximum draw length (28 inches) and the minimum draw weight (20 pounds) can only be reached at the minimum draw length (18 inches). Fully maxed out this bow can shoot up to 281 fps.

Colours
The Hoyt Ruckus comes in many colours including: Realtree AP, Blackout, Realtree Max 1, Realtree pink, half and half, Realtree snow, custom red, custom blue, custom black, pear white and pink.

References

Archery
Bows (archery)